The Wild Health Genomes were an American professional baseball team based in Lexington, Kentucky. Founded in 2022, they were a member of the Atlantic League of Professional Baseball, an MLB Partner League. The Genomes were owned by the same group as the then-named Lexington Legends and shared Wild Health Field with the Legends.

Following the addition of the Staten Island FerryHawks as the ninth Atlantic League team, the Genomes were created to ensure an even number of teams for the 2022 season. This was the first time that an Atlantic League "filler" team has had a home stadium, as the Road Warriors were a travelling club during their intermittent stints in the league.

The Genomes made history on March 23, 2022 when they drafted catcher Alexis "Scrappy" Hopkins with the eighth pick, the first woman ever drafted for an on-field role in professional baseball.  In their lone season, they finished in 3rd place in the South Division during the first half with a 35-31 record, then finished the second half in a tie for third with the High Point Rockers at 32-34. With the Gastonia Honey Hunters winning both halves, the Genomes' 67-65 overall record saw them finish four games behind the Rockers for the wild card spot.

Following the season, the Genomes' spot in the league was purchased by Attain Sports and Entertainment, owners of the Bowie Baysox and Frederick Keys.  The new club will play at Nymeo Field at Harry Grove Stadium, home of the Keys, in 2023.  It is not known if the new Frederick team will continue past 2023 or will also be a "filler" team in anticipation of the previously announced Hagerstown team, which is scheduled to begin play in 2024.

Season by season results
The Wild Health Genomes franchise played 1 season in the Atlantic League of Professional Baseball (2022). As of the completion of the 2022 season, the club played in 132 regular season games and compiled a record of 67 - 65 or a .508 winning percentage. The team had a postseason record of 0-0.

Roster

References

External links

Atlantic League of Professional Baseball teams
Baseball teams established in 2022
Professional baseball teams in Kentucky
Genomes
2022 establishments in Kentucky